Nurta is a rural locality (a selo) in Zakamensky District, Republic of Buryatia, Russia. The population was 300 as of 2010. There are 8 streets.

Geography 
Nurta is located 19 km west of Zakamensk (the district's administrative centre) by road. Zakamensk is the nearest rural locality.

References 

Rural localities in Zakamensky District